Encounter is a studio album by Brazilian jazz singer Flora Purim that was released in 1977 on Milestone Records.

Reception
AllMusic awarded the album with 4.5 stars and in its review, Scott Yanow calls it: "one of Flora Purim's finest all-around jazz recordings".

Track listing

Personnel 
 Flora Purim – lead vocals, backing vocals
 Joe Henderson – tenor saxophone (tracks: 1 and 8) 
 Raul de Souza – trombone (tracks: 2 and 4)
 McCoy Tyner – acoustic piano (tracks: 5 and 6)
 George Duke – electric piano, synthesizer (tracks: 1, 4, 7 and 8)
 Hermeto Pascoal – electric piano, clavinet, vocals (tracks: 2, 3, 4 and 7)
 Hugo Fattoruso – synthesizer (track: 2)
 Ron Carter – acoustic bass (tracks: 3, 4 and 7)
 Alphonso Johnson – electric bass (track: 8)
 Byron Miller – electric bass (track: 1)
 Airto Moreira – drums, percussion (tracks: 1 to 5, 7 and 8)
 Leon "Ndugu" Chancler – drums, percussion (track: 1)
 Googie Coppola – vocals (track: 7)
 Urszula Dudziak – vocals (track: 7)

References 

1977 albums
Flora Purim albums
Milestone Records albums
Albums produced by Orrin Keepnews